Lindsay James Smith (born 18 September 1954), is an English former professional footballer who played as a central defender in the English Football League.

Career
Born in Westminster, Smith began his career at Colchester United. He made his debut against Grimsby Town at the age of 16 years 214 days on 20 April 1971, becoming Colchester's youngest player to appear in the league, a record that stood until 2019. He went on to make 211 league appearances for Colchester, being named in the PFA Team of the Year for 1976–77 whilst with the U's. He also had loan spells at Charlton Athletic and Millwall. He was signed by Cambridge United in 1978 and where he made 174 league appearances. He was loaned out to Lincoln City during this time. He moved to Plymouth Argyle in 1982 and then to Millwall in 1984, before returning to Cambridge in 1986. He later made appearances for Bury Town.

Smith had an unusual skill-set for someone who played most of his career as a defender. Originally a spindly teenager, he was known for his dribbling skills, often coming on as substitute on the left wing. He was then tried as a midfielder and then as an overlapping left back. However, as his body matured, he became strong in the air and he was used by Colchester as a central defender, and occasionally even as a target man up front. His occasional forays up the left wing from his position in central defense caught many teams by surprise.

Honours

Club
Cambridge United
 Football League Third Division Runner-up (1): 1977–78

Individual
 PFA Team of the Year (1): 1976–77

References

External links
 

1954 births
Living people
English footballers
Footballers from Westminster
Association football defenders
Charlton Athletic F.C. players
Colchester United F.C. players
Cambridge United F.C. players
Millwall F.C. players
Lincoln City F.C. players
Plymouth Argyle F.C. players
Bury Town F.C. players
English Football League players
Ely City F.C. players